The football Youth Leagues in Chile go from U8 to U20.

External links 
ANFP Fútbol Joven

Youth
Lea